Geraint Talfan Davies OBE DL (born 30 December 1943) is a Welsh journalist and broadcaster, and a long-serving trustee and chairman of many Welsh civic, arts, media and cultural organisations.

Personal life and education

Geraint Talfan Davies was born on 30 December 1943, the second of three children of Aneirin Talfan Davies (1909–1980), a Welsh broadcaster, literary critic and poet, and his wife Mary Anne  Evans (1912–1971), a teacher.

Educated at Bishop Gore Grammar School, Swansea and Cardiff High School for Boys, Davies went on to read modern history at Jesus College, Oxford, graduating in 1966.

In 1967, he married Elizabeth Siân Vaughan Yorath, with whom he has three sons, including Rhodri Talfan Davies, who became the director of BBC Cymru Wales.

Career
Davies' career began in 1966 as a graduate trainee with the Western Mail newspaper in Cardiff, where he became its first Welsh Affairs Correspondent. In 1971 he moved to The Journal newspaper in Newcastle upon Tyne, relocating to The Times in London in 1973 where he worked for a year, before returning to the Western Mail in 1974 as assistant editor.

In 1978, Davies moved into broadcasting, as the head of news and current affairs with HTV Wales, becoming assistant controller of programmes in 1982.

He returned to Newcastle in 1987, as director of programmes for Tyne Tees Television. In July 1987 he co-founded the Institute of Welsh Affairs with Cardiff lawyer Keith James. 1990 saw his return to Cardiff, at the start of his ten-year stint as controller of BBC Wales, a position that included overall responsibility for the BBC's television and radio operations in Wales, and the BBC National Orchestra and Chorus of Wales. In 1992 he became chairman of the Institute of Welsh Affairs, a position he would hold until 2014. Davies retired from the BBC in 2000, at the age of 57.  He was succeeded by Menna Richards. His son, Rhodri Talfan Davies, was appointed director of BBC Wales in 2011.

Notable positions

Geraint Talfan Davies has been involved with various arts, media and educational organisations, including the Royal Welsh College of Music and Drama, the Wales International Film Festival, the Artes Mundi visual arts prize, University of Wales Institute, Cardiff, the Wales Millennium Centre and Welsh National Opera.

He chaired Welsh National Opera (WNO) for three years, before his appointment in 2003 to the chair of the Arts Council of Wales (ACW).  His tenure at ACW was cut short in 2006 when, following the Council's successful resistance to Welsh Government plans to take over responsibility for the main national arts organisations, the Culture Minister, Alun Pugh, did not renew his appointment for a second term.  He was then re-elected to the chair of WNO. He was a trustee of the Media Standards Trust (2005–15) and is currently a trustee of the Shakespeare Schools Foundation.

In 2000 he was one of a group that formed Glas Cymru Cyf, with the aim of acquiring Welsh Water with a view to turning it into a not-for-profit company. He was a non-executive of Glas Cymru Cyf from 2000 to 2011. He has also been a member of the BT Wales Advisory Forum.

He is an Honorary Doctor of the University of Glamorgan, and an Honorary Fellow of Jesus College, Oxford, Cardiff Metropolitan University, Swansea University, Bangor University, and of the Royal Institute of British Architects.

Davies has previously held numerous other positions:

 Co-founder and Chairman, Institute of Welsh Affairs, 1992–2014
Chair, Arts Council of Wales, 2003–2006
 Board Member, Wales Millennium Centre, 2000–2003 and 2006–2009
 Board Member, Artes Mundi international visual arts prize
 Trustee, Media Standards Trust, 2005–15
 Chair, Newydd Housing Association, now the Cadarn Housing Group (1975–1978)
 Chair, Cardiff Bay Arts Trust, 1997–2003
 Chair, Wales International Film Festival, 1998–2001
 Chair, Welsh National Opera, 2000–2003 and 2006–present
 Governor, Welsh College of Music and Drama, 1993–1997
 Member of Management Committee, Northern Sinfonia, 1989–1990
 Member, Prince of Wales Committee for the Welsh Environment, 1993–1996
 Member, Radio Authority, 2001–2004
 Trustee, Tenovus Cancer Appeal, 1984–1987
 Trustee, British Bone Marrow Donor Appeal, 1987–1995

He was appointed Officer of the Order of the British Empire (OBE) in the 2014 New Year Honours for services to culture, broadcasting, and charity.

Publications

 Davies, Geraint Talfan (2018) Unfinished Business: Journal of an Embattled European. Cardigan. Parthian Books.

References

 
 
 Biography at Ofcom.org.uk, October 2007
 The IWA's Board of Directors, October 2007
 BT Wales Advisory Forum, October 2007

External links
 Institute of Welsh Affairs website

1943 births
Welsh-speaking journalists
Living people
BBC people
Welsh journalists
Alumni of Jesus College, Oxford
Welsh television executives
Officers of the Order of the British Empire